Todd Creek is a stream in Platte County in the U.S. state of Missouri. It is a tributary of the Little Platte River.

Todd Creek has the name of Joseph Todd, a pioneer settler.

See also
List of rivers of Missouri

References

Rivers of Platte County, Missouri
Rivers of Missouri